Fisher cat is a relative of the weasel. It may also refer to:

 New Hampshire Fisher Cats, a minor-league baseball team in the US
 Fishing cat, a wild cat found in Asia (Prionailurus viverrinus)

See also 
 Fisher (disambiguation)
 Swimming cat or Van cat, a landrace of domestic cat

Animal common name disambiguation pages